Innanu Aa Kalyanam is a 2011 Malayalam drama film directed by Rajasenan, starring Rejith Menon, Malavika Wales and Saranya Mohan.

Plot 
This film is about two friends – Neelima and Aisha, both engineering students of a college. Karthik is a student in the same college. He comes from a poor family. How he and Kunjumon, who also studies in the same college, influence the lives of Neelima and Aisha is the main plot of the film.

Cast 
 Rejith Menon as Karthik
 Saranya Mohan as Aisha
 Malavika Wales as Neelima
 Roshan Basheer as Kunjumon
 Sai Kumar as Sulochanan Pillai, Neelima's father
 Rohini  as Lillykutty, Neelima's mother
 Maniyanpilla Raju as Kuttichan, Sulochanan's secretary
 Jagathy Sreekumar as Sundaresan, Kunjomon's father
 Ashokan as Krishnankutty a.k.a. Chris
 Kunchan as Chris's father
 Sudheesh as Shameer
 Bindu Panicker as Susheela, Kunjumon's mother
 Mammukoya as a marriage broker
 Suraj Venjaramoodu as Ganapati Iyer, principal of the college
 Indrans as a staff of the college

Soundtrack

References

Sify.com

2010s Malayalam-language films
Films directed by Rajasenan